Crossroads Kitchen is a vegan fine-dining restaurant in the Beverly Grove neighborhood of Los Angeles.

History
Crossroads opened in 2013 in the Beverly Grove neighborhood. According to Los Angeles magazine, the majority of customers are non-vegan.

Food
The restaurant has a Mediterranean focus and a small-plates format. Soy foods such as tempeh and tofu are not offered, as soybeans aren't a Mediterranean product. Signature dishes include a "seafood" tower and artichoke "oysters".

Reception
In 2019, Big 7 Travel named them one of 50 best vegan-friendly restaurants in the world.

In 2018 USA Today named them one of the ten best vegan restaurants in the country. 

In 2017 Tasting Table named them one of the eight best vegan restaurants in the U.S. and The Daily Meal named them one of the best vegan restaurants in the United States.

In 2015 PETA named them one of the six best vegan fine-dining restaurants in the U.S. and BuzzFeed named them one of 24 "bucket list" vegan restaurants.

In 2014 Relish named them one of the 15 best vegan and vegetarian restaurants in the U.S.

In 2013 Travel + Leisure named them one of the best vegetarian restaurants in the U.S.

Oprah Winfrey called Crossroads owner and chef Tal Ronnen "America's best vegan chef" after he "helped her prep for her 21-day vegan challenge, when she also gave up sugar, gluten and alcohol." Vogue called his cuisine, "as flavorful as it gets."

Criticism
Patric Kuh of Los Angeles magazine said he wished the restaurant "did more with raw ingredients and, ironically enough, with vegetables," and that the legume dishes lacked inspiration.

See also
List of vegetarian restaurants

References

Vegan restaurants in California
2013 establishments in California
Fine dining
Vegan cuisine
Restaurants established in 2013